Yu Ke (1913–2004), original name Yu Wen, was a People's Republic of China politician. He was born in Changchun, Jilin Province. He was governor and People's Congress Chairman of his home province. He was a delegate to the 5th National People's Congress (1978–1983).

1913 births
2004 deaths
People's Republic of China politicians from Jilin
Chinese Communist Party politicians from Jilin
Governors of Jilin
Politicians from Changchun
Delegates to the 5th National People's Congress
Chinese police officers